Wayne Lamar Jackson (November 24, 1941 – June 21, 2016) was an American soul and R&B musician, playing the trumpet in the Mar-Keys, in the house band at Stax Records and later as one of The Memphis Horns, described as "arguably the greatest soul horn section ever".

Jackson was born in West Memphis, Arkansas just a few days apart from his musical partner Andrew Love with whom he created the signature horn sound at Stax on hit records by Otis Redding, Sam & Dave, and others. Jackson was also the voice on the Mar-Keys singular hit "Last Night", due in part, to his proximity to the microphone.

After the years recording at Stax, they incorporated themselves into The Memphis Horns and began freelancing, recording on sessions for such artists as Neil Diamond, Elvis Presley, Al Green, and Dusty Springfield.  The duo also toured with The Doobie Brothers, Jimmy Buffett, Robert Cray, and numerous other performers.

In 2012, the Memphis Horns received a Grammy Lifetime Achievement Award for outstanding artistic significance in music.

Jackson died on June 21, 2016 at Methodist University Hospital in Memphis of congestive heart failure. His death came after several years of failing health during which he still maintained an active schedule earning an income by giving personalized guided tours at the Stax Museum of American Soul Music. He was 74.

Discography

With Luther Allison
 Live in Chicago (Alligator, 1995 [1999])
With Otis Redding
 Pain in My Heart (Atco Records, 1964)
 The Great Otis Redding Sings Soul Ballads (Atco Records, 1965)
 Otis Blue: Otis Redding Sings Soul (Stax Records, 1965)
 The Soul Album (Stax Records, 1966)
 Complete & Unbelievable: The Otis Redding Dictionary of Soul (Stax Records, 1966)
 King & Queen (Stax Records, 1967)
 The Dock of the Bay (Stax Records, 1968)
With Aretha Franklin
 Aretha Now (Atlantic Records, 1968)
 Young, Gifted and Black (Atlantic Records, 1972)
 Hey Now Hey (The Other Side of the Sky) (Atlantic Records, 1973)
 With Everything I Feel in Me (Atlantic Records, 1974)
With Rob Thomas
 Someday (Atlantic Records, 2010)
With Mark Knopfler
 Sailing to Philadelphia (Mercury Records, 2000)
With Wilson Pickett
 In the Midnight Hour (Atlantic Records, 1965)
 The Exciting Wilson Pickett (Atlantic Records, 1966)
 The Sound of Wilson Pickett (Atlantic Records, 1967)
 Don't Knock My Love (Atlantic Records, 1971)
With Bonnie Raitt
 Longing in Their Hearts (Capitol Records, 1994)
With Dan Penn
 Do Right Man (Sire Records, 1994)
 Blue Nite Lounge (Dandy Records, 2000)
With Frank Black
 Fast Man Rider Man (Cooking Vinyl, 2006)
With B.B. King
 To Know You Is to Love You (ABC Records, 1973)
 Friends (ABC Records, 1974)
With Mark Knopfler and Emmylou Harris
 All the Roadrunning (Mercury Records, 2006)
With Neil Young
 Prairie Wind (Reprise Records, 2005)
With Rita Coolidge
 Letting You Go With Love (Victor, 1997)
 Thinkin' About You (404 Music Group, 1998)
With Rod Stewart
 Soulbook (J Records, 2009)
With Stephen Stills
 Stephen Stills 2 (Atlantic Records, 1971)
With Rufus Thomas
 Do the Funky Chicken (Stax Records, 1970)
With Eddie Floyd
 Knock on Wood (Stax Records, 1967)
With Rodney Crowell
 Street Language (Columbia Records, 1986)
With Sting
 Mercury Falling (A&M Records, 1996)
With Billy Joel
 Storm Front (Columbia Records, 1989)
With José Feliciano
 Memphis Menu (RCA Victor, 1972)
With Tony Joe White
 Tony Joe White (Warner Bros. Records, 1971)
 Uncovered (Swamp Records, 2006)
With Paul Young
 The Crossing (Columbia Records, 1993)
With Peter Gabriel
 So (Geffen, 1986)
 Us (Real World Records, 1992)
With Joe Cocker
 Luxury You Can Afford (Asylum Records, 1978)
With Yvonne Elliman
 Rising Sun (RSO Records, 1975)
With Lulu
 Melody Fair (Atco, 1970)
With James Taylor
 Mud Slide Slim and the Blue Horizon (Warner Bros. Records, 1971)
With William Bell
 The Soul of a Bell (Stax Records, 1967)
 Bound to Happen (Stax Records, 1969)
 Relating (Stax Records, 1974)
With David Porter
 Victim of the Joke? An Opera (Enterprise Records, 1971)
With Nicolette Larson
 In the Nick of Time (Warner Bros. Records, 1979)
With Tom Rush
 Ladies Love Outlaws (Columbia Records, 1974)
With Albert King
 Born Under a Bad Sign (Stax Records, 1967)
With Jimmy Buffett
 Floridays (MCA Records, 1986)
 Hot Water (MCA Records, 1988)
With Carla Thomas
 Love Means... (Stax Records, 1971)
With John Prine
 Common Sense (Atlantic Records, 1975)

References

External links
Wayne Jackson Interview - NAMM Oral History Library (2010)

1941 births
2016 deaths
American trumpeters
American male trumpeters
Musicians from Memphis, Tennessee
People from West Memphis, Arkansas
Musicians from Arkansas